Wakefield station may refer to:

Wakefield station (Metro-North), in New York City, New York, United States
Wakefield–241st Street (IRT White Plains Road Line), in New York City, New York, United States
Wakefield station (MBTA), in Wakefield, Massachusetts, United States
 Wakefield Kirkgate railway station in Wakefield, West Yorkshire, England
 Wakefield Westgate railway station in Wakefield, West Yorkshire, England
 A former railway station on the defunct Nelson line, New Zealand.

See also
Wakefield (disambiguation)